In computer networking, out-of-order delivery is the delivery of data packets in a different order from which they were sent. Out-of-order delivery can be caused by packets following multiple paths through a network, by lower-layer retransmission procedures (such as automatic repeat request), or via parallel processing paths within network equipment that are not designed to ensure that packet ordering is preserved. One of the functions of TCP is to prevent the out-of-order delivery of data, either by reassembling packets in order or requesting retransmission of out-of-order packets.

See also 
 Packet loss
 Selective ACK
 IP fragmentation
 Head-of-line blocking

External links 
 RFC 4737, Packet Reordering Metrics, A. Morton, L. Ciavattone, G. Ramachandran, S. Shalunov, J. Perser, November 2006
 RFC 5236, Improved Packet Reordering Metrics, A. Jayasumana, N. Piratla, T. Banka, A. Bare, R. Whitner, June 2008 
 https://web.archive.org/web/20171022053352/http://kb.pert.geant.net/PERTKB/PacketReordering
 http://www-iepm.slac.stanford.edu/monitoring/reorder/
 https://www.usenix.org/conference/nsdi12/minion-unordered-delivery-wire-compatible-tcp-and-tls

Packets (information technology)